BII Tower is a skyscraper building in Surabaya. It is situated in the city center and has a height of 200 meters. It is one of the highest tower in Surabaya. It is owned by Bank International Indonesia.

The BII Tower is located in front of the Surabaya Plaza and also the submarine museum.

External links
 

Buildings and structures in Surabaya
Skyscrapers in Indonesia
Skyscraper office buildings in Indonesia
Skyscrapers in Surabaya